State Route 529 (SR 529, officially the Yellow Ribbon Highway) is a Washington state highway that connects the cities of Everett and Marysville. After crossing the Steamboat Slough, the road encounters an interchange with I-5, numbered exit 198, before crossing the Ebey Slough and entering Marysville. Before being realigned in 1991, SR 529 started at exit 192 of I-5 and traveled north as Broadway through Downtown Everett to Marysville.

A map published in 1895 of the Snohomish area showed the current and former routes in Everett already complete. By 1898, citizens of both Everett and Marysville were interested in a road that would traverse the Snohomish River delta. A 1911 map of the Mount Vernon area showed the route in Marysville, but the bridges between Everett and Marysville were railroad bridges. State Road 1 became  (PSH 1) in 1937 and PSH 1 became US 99 in 1964. After US 99 was decommissioned, SR 529 was established in 1971. Naval Station Everett was opened in 1991 and SR 529 was realigned on Everett Avenue and Marine View Drive to serve the new naval base. The former route of the highway, now named Broadway, had an interchange with I-5 that was reconstructed between 2005 and 2008 to include high-occupancy vehicle (HOV) lanes and now includes a single-point urban interchange with 41st Street.

Route description

SR 529 begins at exit 193 on I-5, a half-diamond interchange with Pacific Avenue in downtown Everett. The highway turns north on Maple Street and travels along the side of I-5, intersecting the western terminus of US 2 at Hewitt and California avenues near Judd and Black Park.

The roadway then west to become Everett Avenue, which continues east to I-5 as SR 529 Spur.

Leaving the waterfront, SR 529 parallels the Snohomish River southeast to a partial cloverleaf interchange with Broadway, which was SR 529 before 1991 and US 99, and Marine View Drive, which continues southeast to I-5 at exit 195. The highway travels over the Snohomish River onto Smith Island, part of the Delta neighborhood of Everett that is named after the delta of the Snohomish River located to the southwest. The Snohomish River crossing was the busiest segment of SR 529 in 2007, with an estimated daily average of 33,000 motorists. Crossing the Steamboat Slough as a freeway, SR 529 interchanges with I-5 northbound as exit 198 and enters Marysville after crossing the Ebey Slough. Now named State Avenue, the street passes through the waterfront area of Downtown Marysville and the Marysville Mall before ending at the intersection with Fourth Street, signed as  while State Avenue continues north to Smokey Point.

Former route (1971–1991)
Prior to 1991, SR 529 was  shorter and extended from I-5 and 41st Street (exit 192) to Marysville via Broadway. The former and current routes both used the same route from the Marine View Drive intersection to Marysville. The former southern terminus was a large interchange with I-5 and 41st Street, which was  until 1969, that had an underpass under I-5 southbound for a northbound I-5 offramp to Broadway and connections to I-5 northbound were accessed via 41st Street prior to 2005. Broadway continued north past the Everett Memorial Stadium, home of the Everett AquaSox, Everett Avenue (current SR 529) and the Everett Community College to join current SR 529 at the Marine View Drive interchange. Between 2005 and 2008, exit 192 on I-5 was reconstructed. A new flyover ramp from I-5 northbound to Broadway northbound was added and the 41st Street interchange was transformed into a single-point urban interchange.

History

SR 529 was established in 1971, but the road's history predates that. Citizens of both Everett and Marysville proposed that a road between the two cities via the Snohomish River delta was needed, but the proposed roadway was rejected. A subsequent map published in 1911 showed the Everett and Marysville segments complete, but the bridges over the Snohomish River delta were railroad bridges. In 1913, the Pacific Highway was added to the state highway system and used Broadway (former SR 529) in Everett and State Avenue in Marysville to travel between Seattle and the Canada–US border. The Pacific Highway between Everett and Marysville, named the Vernon Road, was paved in 1916 and paid by a county road bond issue. Since the bridges over the Snohomish River delta weren't complete at the time of planning, US 99 used present-day ,  and Sunnyside Boulevard to connect Everett and Marysville. The bridges were completed in 1926 and opened on August 23, 1927, after the creation of US 99.

US 99 fully replaced PSH 1 during the 1964 highway renumbering. (I-5) later replaced US 99 between 1966 and 1970. The state government considered a transfer of the Ebey Slough Bridge to local control in the late 1980s, but dropped the proposal.

In May 1983, the location of a new home port for the United States Navy was narrowed down to Everett and Seattle, as proposed by Senator Henry M. Jackson (D), who died later that September. Everett was selected in April 1984 and the groundbreaking ceremony was held on November 9, 1987. On September 5, 1991, the new navy base was opened and SR 529 was shortened and rerouted to serve the new base, later named Naval Station Everett. A new spur route to serve as a connector between SR 529 and I-5 northbound in 1991. The highway was declared the Yellow Ribbon Highway in November 2009 by the Legislature after a successful campaign led by Everett resident Nathan Olson. The sign unveiling ceremony was attended by WSDOT, elected officials, Naval Station Everett and community members on November 5, 2009. The 4-lane fixed bridge over Ebey Slough that connects SR 529 from Everett to Marysville was fully completed in 2013, replacing a two-lane swing bridge that was 87 years old.

The I-5 and SR 529 interchange in Marysville is planned to be expanded by 2024 with the addition of two ramps and a roundabout that would provide complete access in all directions. The project would also provide traffic to Marysville with a bypass of the congested SR 528 corridor, which is often blocked by trains.

Major intersections

Spur route

Since exit 193, the southern terminus of SR 529, only serves I-5 southbound, the spur route was established in 1991 to complete the interchange. Exit 194 also serves  (US 2), which terminates at SR 529. In 2007, the highway had a daily average of 17,000 motorists.

Major intersections

See also

References

External links

 
 Highways of Washington State

529
Transportation in Snohomish County, Washington
Everett, Washington
U.S. Route 99